Bruno Studer (born 18 June 1978) is a French teacher and politician of La République En Marche! (LREM) who has been serving as a member of the French National Assembly since the 2017 elections, representing the 3rd constituency of Bas-Rhin.

Early career
Studer worked as history and geography teacher in Liverdun, Leverkusen, Metz and Strasbourg.

Political career
Studer was a member of the Union of Democrats and Independents (UDI) before joining LREM in 2017. He has since been heading En Marche! in Strasbourg. In parliament, Studer serves as chairman of the Committee on Cultural Affairs and Education. Since 2019, he has also been a member of the French delegation to the Franco-German Parliamentary Assembly.

In 2018, Studer was put in charge of drafting a bill designed to stop manipulation of information in the run-up to elections. He has also served as rapporteur on bills regulating child labour on YouTube (2020), harmonizing parental control systems offered by internet service providers (2021) and protecting children's rights to their own images (2023).

Other activities
 France Télévisions, Member of the Supervisory Board (since 2017)

See also
 2017 French legislative election

References

1978 births
Living people
Deputies of the 15th National Assembly of the French Fifth Republic
La République En Marche! politicians
Place of birth missing (living people)
Union of Democrats and Independents politicians
Members of Parliament for Bas-Rhin